In Concert is the second live album by Australian band Dead Can Dance, following 1994's Toward the Within. It was released on 22 April 2013 by PIAS Recordings. It was recorded during the Anastasis world tour.

Various versions of the album contained different track listings. The digital download featured the same 16 songs as the limited triple-vinyl box set and the double CD deluxe edition, which are live performances of all Anastasis compositions plus the traditional Arabian song "Lamma Bada", a cover of Tim Buckley's "Song to the Siren" and some earlier Dead Can Dance material. The physical CD contained nine Dead Can Dance songs (five from Anastasis), "Lamma Bada" and "Song to the Siren". The deluxe live edition contained the original studio version of Anastasis and the 11-track version of the concert.

In 2014, it was awarded a silver certification from the Independent Music Companies Association, which indicated sales of at least 20,000 copies throughout Europe.

Track listing

Limited triple-vinyl box set, double CD deluxe edition and digital format track listing

CD track listing

References

External links
  at the band's official website

2013 live albums
Dead Can Dance albums
PIAS Recordings albums